Chilonopsis nonpareil is an extinct species of air-breathing land snails, terrestrial pulmonate gastropod mollusks in the family Achatinidae. This species was endemic to Saint Helena. It is now extinct and was last seen in 1870.

References

nonpareil
Extinct gastropods
Taxonomy articles created by Polbot